Apes (collectively Hominoidea ) are a clade of Old World simians native to sub-Saharan Africa and Southeast Asia (though they were more widespread in Africa, most of Asia, and as well as Europe in prehistory), which together with its sister group Cercopithecidae form the catarrhine clade, cladistically making them monkeys (though this is the subject of much debate). Apes do not have tails due to a mutation of the TBXT gene. In traditional and non-scientific use, the term "ape" can include tailless primates taxonomically considered Cercopithecidae (such as the Barbary ape and black ape), and is thus not equivalent to the scientific taxon Hominoidea. There are two extant branches of the superfamily Hominoidea: the gibbons, or lesser apes; and the hominids, or great apes.
 The family Hylobatidae, the lesser apes, include four genera and a total of 20 species of gibbon, including the lar gibbon and the siamang, all native to Asia. They are highly arboreal and bipedal on the ground. They have lighter bodies and smaller social groups than great apes.
 The family Hominidae (hominids), the great apes, include four genera comprising three extant species of orangutans and their subspecies, two extant species of gorillas and their subspecies, two extant species of panins (bonobos and chimpanzees) and their subspecies, and humans in a single extant subspecies.

Except for gorillas and humans, hominoids are agile climbers of trees. Apes eat a variety of plant and animal foods, with the majority of food being plant foods, which can include fruits, leaves, stalks, roots and seeds, including nuts and grass seeds. Human diets are sometimes substantially different from that of other hominoids due in part to the development of technology and a wide range of habitation. Humans are by far the most numerous of the hominoid species, in fact outnumbering all other primates by a factor of several thousand to one.

All non-human hominoids are rare and threatened with extinction. The eastern hoolock gibbon is the least threatened, only being vulnerable to extinction. Five gibbon species are critically endangered, as are all species of orangutan and gorilla. The remaining species of gibbon, the bonobo, and all four species of chimpanzees are endangered. The chief threat to most of the endangered species is loss of tropical rainforest habitat, though some populations are further imperiled by hunting for bushmeat. The great apes of Africa are also facing threat from the Ebola virus. Currently considered to be the greatest threat to survival of African apes, Ebola infection is responsible for the death of at least one third of all gorillas and chimpanzees since 1990.

Name and terminology 

"Ape", from Old English apa, is a word of uncertain origin. The term has a history of rather imprecise usage—and of comedic or punning usage in the vernacular. Its earliest meaning was generally of any non-human anthropoid primate, as is still the case for its cognates in other Germanic languages.
Later, after the term "monkey" had been introduced into English, "ape" was specialized to refer to a tailless (therefore exceptionally human-like) primate. Thus, the term "ape" obtained two different meanings, as shown in the 1911 Encyclopædia Britannica entry: it could be used as a synonym for "monkey" and it could denote the tailless human-like primate in particular.

Some, or recently all, hominoids are also called "apes", but the term is used broadly and has several different senses within both popular and scientific settings. "Ape" has been used as a synonym for "monkey" or for naming any primate with a human-like appearance, particularly those without a tail. Biologists have traditionally used the term "ape" to mean a member of the superfamily Hominoidea other than humans, but more recently to mean all members of Hominoidea. So "ape"—not to be confused with "great ape"—now becomes another word for hominoid including humans.

The taxonomic term hominoid is derived from, and intended as encompassing, the hominids, the family of great apes. Both terms were introduced by Gray (1825). The term hominins is also due to Gray (1824), intended as including the human lineage (see also Hominidae#Terminology, Human taxonomy).

The distinction between apes and monkeys is complicated by the traditional paraphyly of monkeys: Apes emerged as a sister group of Old World Monkeys in the catarrhines, which are a sister group of New World Monkeys. Therefore, cladistically, apes, catarrhines and related contemporary extinct groups such as Parapithecidaea are monkeys as well, for any consistent definition of "monkey". "Old World Monkey" may also legitimately be taken to be meant to include all the catarrhines, including apes and extinct species such as Aegyptopithecus, in which case the apes, Cercopithecoidea and Aegyptopithecus emerged within the Old World Monkeys.

The primates called "apes" today became known to Europeans after the 18th century. As zoological knowledge developed, it became clear that taillessness occurred in a number of different and otherwise distantly related species. Sir Wilfrid Le Gros Clark was one of those primatologists who developed the idea that there were trends in primate evolution and that the extant members of the order could be arranged in an ".. ascending series", leading from "monkeys" to "apes" to humans. Within this tradition "ape" came to refer to all members of the superfamily Hominoidea except humans. As such, this use of "apes" represented a paraphyletic grouping, meaning that, even though all species of apes were descended from a common ancestor, this grouping did not include all the descendant species, because humans were excluded from being among the apes.

Traditionally, the English-language vernacular name "apes" does not include humans, but phylogenetically, humans (Homo) form part of the family Hominidae within Hominoidaea. Thus, there are at least three common, or traditional, uses of the term "ape": non-specialists may not distinguish between "monkeys" and "apes", that is, they may use the two terms interchangeably; or they may use "ape" for any tailless monkey or non-human hominoid; or they may use the term "ape" to just mean the non-human hominoids.

Modern taxonomy aims for the use of monophyletic groups for taxonomic classification;
Some literature may now use the common name "ape" to mean all members of the superfamily Hominoidea, including humans. For example, in his 2005 book, Benton wrote "The apes, Hominoidea, today include the gibbons and orang-utan ... the gorilla and chimpanzee ... and humans". Modern biologists and primatologists refer to apes that are not human as "non-human" apes. Scientists broadly, other than paleoanthropologists, may use the term "hominin" to identify the human clade, replacing the term "hominid". See terminology of primate names.

See below, History of hominoid taxonomy, for a discussion of changes in scientific classification and terminology regarding hominoids.

Evolution 

Although the hominoid fossil record is still incomplete and fragmentary, there is now enough evidence to provide an outline of the evolutionary history of humans. Previously, the divergence between humans and other extant hominoids was thought to have occurred 15 to 20 million years ago, and several species of that time period, such as Ramapithecus, were once thought to be hominins and possible ancestors of humans. But, later fossil finds indicated that Ramapithecus was more closely related to the orangutan; and new biochemical evidence indicates that the last common ancestor of humans and non-hominins (that is, the chimpanzees) occurred between 5 and 10 million years ago, and probably nearer the lower end of that range (more recent); see Chimpanzee–human last common ancestor (CHLCA).

Taxonomic classification and phylogeny 

Genetic analysis combined with fossil evidence indicates that hominoids diverged from the Old World monkeys about 25 million years ago (mya), near the Oligocene–Miocene boundary. The gibbons split from the rest about 18 mya, and the hominid splits happened 14 mya (Pongo), 7 mya (Gorilla), and 3–5 mya (Homo & Pan). In 2015, a new genus and species were described, Pliobates cataloniae, which lived 11.6 mya, and appears to predate the split between Hominidae and Hylobatidae.

The families, and extant genera and species of hominoids are:
 Superfamily Hominoidea
 Family Hominidae: hominids ("great apes")
 Genus Pongo: orangutans
 Bornean orangutan, P. pygmaeus
 Sumatran orangutan, P. abelii
 Tapanuli orangutan, P. tapanuliensis
 Genus Gorilla: gorillas
 Western gorilla, G. gorilla
 Eastern gorilla, G. beringei
 Genus Homo: humans
 Human, H. sapiens
 Genus Pan: chimpanzees
 Chimpanzee, P. troglodytes
 Bonobo, P. paniscus
 Family Hylobatidae: gibbons ("lesser apes")
 Genus Hylobates
 Lar gibbon or white-handed gibbon, H. lar
 Bornean white-bearded gibbon, H. albibarbis
 Agile gibbon or black-handed gibbon, H. agilis
Western grey gibbon or Abbott's grey gibbon, H. abbotti
 Eastern grey gibbon or northern grey gibbon, H. funereus
 Müller's gibbon or southern grey gibbon, H. muelleri
 Silvery gibbon, H. moloch
 Pileated gibbon or capped gibbon, H. pileatus
 Kloss's gibbon or Mentawai gibbon or bilou, H. klossii
 Genus Hoolock
 Western hoolock gibbon, H. hoolock
 Eastern hoolock gibbon, H. leuconedys
 Skywalker hoolock gibbon, H. tianxing
 Genus Symphalangus
 Siamang, S. syndactylus
 Genus Nomascus
 Northern buffed-cheeked gibbon, N. annamensis
 Black crested gibbon, N. concolor
 Eastern black crested gibbon, N. nasutus
 Hainan black crested gibbon, N. hainanus
 Southern white-cheeked gibbon N. siki
 White-cheeked crested gibbon, N. leucogenys
 Yellow-cheeked gibbon, N. gabriellae

History of hominoid taxonomy 

The history of hominoid taxonomy is complex and somewhat confusing. Recent evidence has changed our understanding of the relationships between the hominoids, especially regarding the human lineage; and the traditionally used terms have become somewhat confused. Competing approaches to methodology and terminology are found among current scientific sources. Over time, authorities have changed the names and the meanings of names of groups and subgroups as new evidence — that is, new discoveries of fossils and tools and of observations in the field, plus continual comparisons of anatomy and DNA sequences — has changed the understanding of relationships between hominoids. There has been a gradual demotion of humans from being 'special' in the taxonomy to being one branch among many. This recent turmoil (of history) illustrates the growing influence on all taxonomy of cladistics, the science of classifying living things strictly according to their lines of descent.

Today, there are eight extant genera of hominoids. They are the four genera in the family Hominidae, namely Homo, Pan, Gorilla, and Pongo; plus four genera in the family Hylobatidae (gibbons): Hylobates, Hoolock, Nomascus and Symphalangus. (The two subspecies of hoolock gibbons were recently moved from the genus Bunopithecus to the new genus Hoolock and re-ranked as species; a third species was described in January 2017).

In 1758, Carl Linnaeus, relying on second- or third-hand accounts, placed a second species in Homo along with H. sapiens: Homo troglodytes ("cave-dwelling man"). Although the term "Orang Outang" is listed as a variety – Homo sylvestris – under this species, it is nevertheless not clear to which animal this name refers, as Linnaeus had no specimen to refer to, hence no precise description. Linnaeus may have based Homo troglodytes on reports of mythical creatures, then-unidentified simians, or Asian natives dressed in animal skins. Linnaeus named the orangutan Simia satyrus ("satyr monkey"). He placed the three genera Homo, Simia and Lemur in the order of Primates.

The troglodytes name was used for the chimpanzee by Blumenbach in 1775, but moved to the genus Simia. The orangutan was moved to the genus Pongo in 1799 by Lacépède.

Linnaeus's inclusion of humans in the primates with monkeys and apes was troubling for people who denied a close relationship between humans and the rest of the animal kingdom. Linnaeus's Lutheran archbishop had accused him of "impiety". In a letter to Johann Georg Gmelin dated 25 February 1747, Linnaeus wrote:

Accordingly, Johann Friedrich Blumenbach in the first edition of his Manual of Natural History (1779), proposed that the primates be divided into the Quadrumana (four-handed, i.e. apes and monkeys) and Bimana (two-handed, i.e. humans). This distinction was taken up by other naturalists, most notably Georges Cuvier. Some elevated the distinction to the level of order.

However, the many affinities between humans and other primates – and especially the "great apes" – made it clear that the distinction made no scientific sense. In his 1871 book The Descent of Man, and Selection in Relation to Sex, Charles Darwin wrote:

Changes in taxonomy and terminology

Characteristics 

The lesser apes are the gibbon family, Hylobatidae, of sixteen species; all are native to Asia. Their major differentiating characteristic is their long arms, which they use to brachiate through trees. Their wrists are ball and socket joints as an evolutionary adaptation to their arboreal lifestyle.

The superfamily Hominoidea falls within the parvorder Catarrhini, which also includes the Old World monkeys of Africa and Eurasia. Within this grouping, the two families Hylobatidae and Hominidae can be distinguished from Old World monkeys by the number of cusps on their molars; hominoids have five in the "Y-5" molar pattern, whereas Old World monkeys have only four in a bilophodont pattern.

Further, in comparison with Old World monkeys, hominoids are noted for: more mobile shoulder joints and arms due to the dorsal position of the scapula; broader ribcages that are flatter front-to-back; and a shorter, less mobile spine, with greatly reduced caudal (tail) vertebrae—resulting in complete loss of the tail in extant hominoid species. These are anatomical adaptations, first, to vertical hanging and swinging locomotion (brachiation) and, later, to developing balance in a bipedal pose. Note there are primates in other families that also lack tails, and at least one, the pig-tailed langur, is known to walk significant distances bipedally. The front of the ape skull is characterised by its sinuses, fusion of the frontal bone, and by post-orbital constriction.

Distinction from monkeys 

Cladistically, apes, catarrhines, and extinct species such as Aegyptopithecus and Parapithecidaea, are monkeys, so one can only specify ape features not present in other monkeys.

Unlike most monkeys, apes do not possess a tail. Monkeys are more likely to be in trees and use their tails for balance. While the great apes are considerably larger than monkeys, gibbons (lesser apes) are smaller than some monkeys. Apes are considered to be more intelligent than monkeys, which are considered to have more primitive brains.

Behaviour 

Major studies of behaviour in the field were completed on the three better-known "great apes", for example by Jane Goodall, Dian Fossey and Birute Galdikas. These studies have shown that in their natural environments, the non-human hominoids show sharply varying social structure: gibbons are monogamous, territorial pair-bonders, orangutans are solitary, gorillas live in small troops with a single adult male leader, while chimpanzees live in larger troops with bonobos exhibiting promiscuous sexual behaviour. Their diets also vary; gorillas are foliovores, while the others are all primarily frugivores, although the common chimpanzee hunts for meat. Foraging behaviour is correspondingly variable.

Diet 

Apart from humans and gorillas, apes eat a predominantly frugivorous diet, mostly fruit, but supplemented with a variety of other foods. Gorillas are predominately folivorous, eating mostly stalks, shoots, roots and leaves with some fruit and other foods. Non-human apes usually eat a small amount of raw animal foods such as insects or eggs. In the case of humans, migration and the invention of hunting tools and cooking has led to an even wider variety of foods and diets, with many human diets including large amounts of cooked tubers (roots) or legumes. Other food production and processing methods including animal husbandry and industrial refining and processing have further changed human diets. Humans and other apes occasionally eat other primates. Some of these primates are now close to extinction with habitat loss being the underlying cause.

Cognition 

All the non-human hominoids are generally thought of as highly intelligent, and scientific study has broadly confirmed that they perform very well on a wide range of cognitive tests—though there is relatively little data on gibbon cognition. The early studies by Wolfgang Köhler demonstrated exceptional problem-solving abilities in chimpanzees, which Köhler attributed to insight. The use of tools has been repeatedly demonstrated; more recently, the manufacture of tools has been documented, both in the wild and in laboratory tests. Imitation is much more easily demonstrated in "great apes" than in other primate species. Almost all the studies in animal language acquisition have been done with "great apes", and though there is continuing dispute as to whether they demonstrate real language abilities, there is no doubt that they involve significant feats of learning. Chimpanzees in different parts of Africa have developed tools that are used in food acquisition, demonstrating a form of animal culture.

See also 

 Dawn of Humanity (2015 PBS film)
 World Declaration on Great Apes from the Great Ape Project
 International Primate Day
 List of individual apes (for notable non-fictional non-human apes)
 List of fictional primates
 List of primates by population

Notes

References

Literature cited

External links

 
 
  Agreement between cladograms based on molecular and anatomical data.
 Human Timeline (Interactive) – Smithsonian, National Museum of Natural History (August 2016).

 
Extant Chattian first appearances
Taxa named by John Edward Gray